Asghar Ghahremani Keri Bozorg (born 6 March 1972) is an Iranian professional futsal coach and former player. He is currently goalkeeping coach of Iran national futsal team.

Honours

Country 
 AFC Futsal Championship
 Champion (4): 1999 - 2000 - 2007 - 2008

Club

Individual

References

1972 births
Living people
Iranian men's futsal players
Futsal goalkeepers
Persepolis FSC players